Wallace Falls State Park is a public recreation area that encompasses  along the Wallace River in Snohomish County, Washington. The park features three waterfalls, three backcountry lakes, old-growth coniferous forests, rushing mountain rivers and streams, and the evidence of its logging history in the ruins of railroad trestles, disused railroad grades, and springboard notches in stumps.

History
The name "Wallace" is a corruption of the last name of Joe and Sarah Kwayaylsh, members of the Skykomish tribe, who were the first homesteaders in the area. The park originated with the state's purchase of land from the Weyerhaeuser Timber Company in 1971.

Waterfalls
The park has three waterfalls: Upper Wallace Falls, which cannot be viewed in its entirety and drops  in five separate tiers;  Wallace Falls, the highlight of the park, which falls in three sections—the largest of which drops  and can be seen from the Skykomish Valley; and Lower Wallace Falls, which drops  in five tiers.

Activities and amenities

References

External links

Wallace Falls State Park Washington State Parks and Recreation Commission 
Wallace Falls State Park Map Washington State Parks and Recreation Commission

Parks in Snohomish County, Washington
State parks of Washington (state)
Waterfalls of Washington (state)
Waterfalls of Snohomish County, Washington